Norris City is a village in White County, Illinois. The population was 1,275 at the 2010 census.

History
Norris City was incorporated in 1901.

The original plat of Norris City was filed for record in the White County Courthouse in Carmi, Illinois on August 17, 1871 at 8 a.m.

The post office at Norris City was established May 15, 1871, with William A. Johnson appointed as the first Postmaster.
The name for Norris City had to have been decided prior to the time it was platted and prior to the opening of the post office. The question of how Norris City got its name has caused many debates throughout the years.
The new community, for a short time in early 1871, was called “Popeye” or “Popeye’s Station, after William A. Johnson, the first depot agent at the site who had the nickname of Popeye. The trainmen said they were stopping at “Popeye” or “Popeye’s Station.”
The story is that Mr. Johnson's eyes protruded, so he was given the nickname of Popeye. This was before the days of the Popeye cartoon character, which was created by a native of Chester, Ill.. The story is, that children going to Gum Prairie Grade School near Mr. Johnson's house gave him the nickname. The other story is that he was given the nickname by the trainmen.
Stories about how Norris City got its name are varied, but the following is a result of my research:
First off, it was not named after any of the aforementioned people involved in getting Norris City started and platted. This deepens the mystery.
According to one story, the people of the new village got together to try to agree upon a name for it. It was decided that the name would come from the person or family having the most land in the area. After the acreages were added up, the Norris family beat out the Johnson family by just a few acres. Thus, as the story goes, it was named Norris City. William Norris was the head of the Norris family at that time so it was said to have been named after him.
		
Another version is that a meeting was held and the railroad had been doing some business with William Norris so they decided to name the town Norris City after him. So the story goes that he went home from the meeting and told his wife, Emaline (White) Norris, and she replied she didn't think it was such a big deal to have such a small place named after you.
Another story is that Thomas Ridgway, for whom Ridgway was named, was on a train going through here. Mr. Ridgway was  the President of the Springfield and Illinois Southeastern Railroad, and he asked what the town had been named. It is said that the foreman of the construction crew, or one version says he was conductor or engineer of the train, spoke up and said the trainmen call it Popeye or Popeye's Station. Mr. Ridgway, so the story goes, said that was no name for a town. This trainman is then supposed to have said, “Why don’t you name it after me?” So they did. His name was supposed to have been John William Norris of Fairfield. Nellie Johnson, wife of Mel Johnson, said her father was on the train when this happened. Mel and Nellie Johnson operated Johnson's Hardware of the south side of East Main Street in Norris City for years.
Another version of this story is that the engineer of the work train constructing the railroad tracks to the site of Norris City boarded at the home of William Norris, and his wife Emaline (White) Norris at the west edge of the site of the new village. It is said that he was the one who spoke up and suggested the name for the town. He was fond of the cooking of Mrs. Emaline Norris, who was noted as a good cook. For this reason, it is said that he suggested the name Norris City, naming the town after her and not her husband, William Norris. Jessie (Robb) Newkirk, wife of Vollie Newkirk (parents of Beth (Newkirk) Rister) and a granddaughter of William and Emaline Norris said that her grandmother always said that the town was named after her and not after her husband. A brother and a sister of Jessie Newkirk also told the same story that had been told to them by their grandmother Norris.

The book, “Illinois, a Descriptive and Historical Guide,” compiled in 1939 by Federal Works Agency, Works Project Administration, states that Norris City, altitude 444, population 1109, a trading center for an agricultural and coal mining district was named in honor of a pioneer settler, William Norris.
A reference report of the Illinois State Historical Library states, “No information is available in our records as to the origins of the name, Norris City.”

Geography
Norris City is located at  (37.979816, -88.327219).

Demographics

As of the census of 2000, there were 1,057 people, 492 households, and 296 families residing in the village. The racial makeup of the village was 98.30% White, 0.66% Native American, 0.28% Asian, and 0.76% from two or more races. Hispanic or Latino of any race were 0.09% of the population.

There were 492 households, out of which 23.6% had children under the age of 18 living with them, 49.8% were married couples living together, 6.9% had a female householder with no husband present, and 39.8% were non-families. 37.0% of all households were made up of individuals, and 22.2% had someone living alone who was 65 years of age or older. The average household size was 2.15 and the average family size was 2.81.

In the village, the population was spread out, with 20.4% under the age of 18, 8.2% from 18 to 24, 26.1% from 25 to 44, 21.9% from 45 to 64, and 23.4% who were 65 years of age or older. The median age was 41 years. For every 100 females, there were 84.8 males. For every 100 females age 18 and over, there were 80.9 males.

The median income for a household in the village was $22,121, and the median income for a family was $29,412. Males had a median income of $25,972 versus $14,868 for females. The per capita income for the village was $13,671. About 9.4% of families and 14.4% of the population were below the poverty line, including 23.9% of those under age 18 and 9.7% of those age 65 or over.

Culture
A popular festival known as Dairy Days takes place during the weekend of the fourth Saturday in September each year. Dairy Days has been held annually since 1947. The festival was organized by the Lions Club until 2009, when the Dairy Days Association was formed to coordinate the annual festival.

Notable people

 Ora Collard, Illinois state representative and businessman; born in Norris City
 Max Morris, pro football and basketball player; born in Norris City
 Floyd Newkirk, pitcher for the New York Yankees; born in Norris City

References

Villages in White County, Illinois
Villages in Illinois
Populated places established in 1901
1871 establishments in Illinois